Cyanidin-3-O-glucoside 2-O-glucuronosyltransferase (BpUGT94B1, UDP-glucuronic acid:anthocyanin glucuronosyltransferase, UDP-glucuronic acid:anthocyanidin 3-glucoside 2'-O-beta-glucuronosyltransferase, BpUGAT, UDP-D-glucuronate:cyanidin-3-O-beta-glucoside 2-O-beta-glucuronosyltransferase) is an enzyme with systematic name UDP-D-glucuronate:cyanidin-3-O-beta-D-glucoside 2-O-beta-D-glucuronosyltransferase. This enzyme catalyses the following chemical reaction

 UDP-D-glucuronate + cyanidin 3-O-beta-D-glucoside  UDP + cyanidin 3-O-(2-O-beta-D-glucuronosyl)-beta-D-glucoside

The enzyme is highly specific for cyanidin 3-O-glucosides and UDP-D-glucuronate.

References

External links 
 

EC 2.4.1